General Pinedo may refer to:

 General Pinedo, Chaco, a town in Argentina
 Tnte. Gral. Gerardo Pérez Pinedo Airport, a regional airport in Atalaya, Peru

See also
 Pinedo (disambiguation)